Nocardiopsis alkaliphila  is an alkaliphilic bacterium from the genus of Nocardiopsis which has been isolated from soil from Egypt. Nocardiopsis alkaliphila produces nocardiopyrone A, nocardiopyrone B and pyridinols.

References

Further reading

External links 
Type strain of Nocardiopsis alkaliphila at BacDive -  the Bacterial Diversity Metadatabase

Actinomycetales
Bacteria described in 2004